Melaleuca grieveana is a plant in the myrtle family, Myrtaceae and is endemic to the south-west of Western Australia. It is similar to Melaleuca brophyi with its heads of yellow flowers and almost cylindrical leaves. The main difference is that the leaves of this species, but not those of Melaleuca brophyi are covered with soft hairs.

Description

The flowers are creamy-white to yellow and are arranged in heads on the ends of branches which continue to grow after flowering, sometimes also in the upper leaf axils. There are five bundles of stamens around the flower, each with 3 to 6 stamens.

Taxonomy and naming
Melaleuca grieveana was first formally described in 1999 by Lyndley Craven in Australian Systematic Botany from a specimen collected near Wyalkatchem in 1937. The specific epithet (grieveana) is in honour of the Australian botanist, Brian Grieve who wrote books on the identification of Western Australian flora.

Distribution and habitat
Melaleuca grieveana occurs in the Cowcowing, Narembeen and Moorine Rock districts in the Avon Wheatbelt and Mallee biogeographic regions where it grows in sandplain vegetation or mallee.

Conservation status
Melaleuca grieveana is listed as "Priority One" by the Government of Western Australia Department of Parks and Wildlife meaning that it is "known from one or a few locations (generally five or less) which are potentially at risk".

References

grieveana
Plants described in 1999
Endemic flora of Western Australia
Taxa named by Lyndley Craven